Five ships of the Royal Navy and an air station of the Royal Naval Air Service have borne the name HMS Landrail, another name for the bird more commonly named a corn crake:

  was a 4-gun schooner launched in 1806 and sold around 1816.
  was a wood paddle tug, previously in civilian service as Gipsy King.  She was purchased in 1855 and sold in 1856.
  was a  wood screw gunvessel launched in 1860 and sold into civilian service in 1869, being renamed Walrus. She was wrecked in October 1876
  was a Curlew-class torpedo gunvessel launched in 1886 and sunk as a target in 1906.
  was a  destroyer launched in 1914.  She was to have been named HMS Hotspur, but was renamed in 1913.  She was sold in 1921.
 HMS Landrail was the name given to RNAS Machrihanish, in commission between 1940 and 1963.

Royal Navy ship names